Piz Sardona (or Surenstock) is a mountain in the Glarus Alps, on the border between the cantons Glarus and St. Gallen. The 3,056 metre high mountain overlooks the valleys of Elm (Glarus) and Calfeisen (St. Gallen). Less than one kilometre south of the summit lies the tripoint (3,000 metres) between the cantons of Glarus, St. Gallen and Graubünden. The summit itself is the northernmost point above 3,000 metres in Switzerland.

The massif is covered by a few small glaciers, the Sardonagletscher lying near the summit on the east side.

Piz Sardona is in the Glarus thrust area, a geologic UNESCO world heritage site, named "Swiss Tectonic Arena Sardona".

The Foo Pass lies to the north of the Piz Sardona and has a hiking trail from Weisstannen in St. Gallen to Elm in Glarus, forming part of the Alpine Pass Route between Sargans to Montreux.

References

External links
Piz Sardona on Summitpost
Piz Sardona on Hikr

Mountains of the Alps
Alpine three-thousanders
Mountains of Switzerland
Mountains of the canton of St. Gallen
Mountains of the canton of Glarus
Glarus–St. Gallen border